Baidul is a small village near Balurghat in South Dinajpur district of West Bengal.  From Balurghat, one needs to go 6 km on National Highway 512 (India) to Pagligunj and then take a right on the metalled road to Patiram.  Baidul is about 4 km from the Pagligunj right turn.  The road eventually leads to Nazirpur village and thence to Patiram.

Durga puja in Baidul is famous.

See also

Villages in Dakshin Dinajpur district